Guo Yuanqiang (born July 1965) is a Chinese politician who is the current party secretary of Wuhan, in office since September 2021. He is a representative of the 19th National Congress of the Communist Party of China and was a member of the 12th National Committee of the Chinese People's Political Consultative Conference.

Early life and education
Guo was born in Guangshan County, Henan, in July 1965. In 1984, he was admitted to Central China Normal University, where he majored in chemistry. He joined the Communist Party of China (CPC) in June 1986.

Academic career
After graduating in 1988, he joined the faculty of Guangxi Agricultural College (now Guangxi Agricultural University). He began graduate work at the Guangzhou Institute of Chemistry, Chinese Academy of Sciences in 1990 and earned his master's degree in 1993. In July 1993, he was hired as an engineer at the Guangdong Petrochemical Import and Export Trade Company. In October 1996, he entered the Guangzhou Institute of Chemistry, Chinese Academy of Sciences, where he successively worked as an assistant researcher, associate researcher, and researcher.

Career in Guangdong
Guo began his political career in August 2003, when he was appointed deputy director of Guangdong Provincial Quality Supervision Bureau. In July 2008, he became vice mayor of Maoming, party secretary of Gaozhou and chairman of Gaozhou Municipal People's Congress. He became director and party branch secretary of Guangdong Provincial Department of Foreign Trade and Economic Cooperation in March 2012, which was reshuffled as Guangdong Provincial Department of Commerce in December 2013. In March 2016, he was transferred to the coastal city Zhuhai and appointed party secretary and chairman of Zhuhai Municipal People's Congress. His predecessor Li Jia was placed under investigation by the Central Commission for Discipline Inspection, the party's internal disciplinary body, for "serious violations of regulations".

Career in Jiangsu
In January 2018, he was transferred to east China's Jiangsu province and appointed vice governor. In October 2019, he became secretary general of CPC Jiangsu Provincial Committee and party secretary of Jiangsu Provincial Organ Working Committee, and was admitted to member of the standing committee of the CPC Jiangsu Provincial Committee, the province's top authority. He concurrently served as head of Organization Department of CPC Jiangsu Provincial Committee and president of Jiangsu Party School of the Communist Party of China since February 2021.

Career in Hubei 
In September 2021, he was despatched to central China's Hubei province, where he was named party chief of Wuhan, his first foray into a regional leadership role. The position has been vacant for five months since Wang Zhonglin was promoted to governor of Hubei.

References

1965 births
Living people
People from Guangshan County
Central China Normal University alumni
People's Republic of China politicians from Henan
Chinese Communist Party politicians from Henan
Members of the 12th Chinese People's Political Consultative Conference